Bernard M. Gross (born May 22, 1935) is a former Democratic member of the Pennsylvania House of Representatives.
 He was born in Philadelphia.

References

Democratic Party members of the Pennsylvania House of Representatives
Living people
1935 births
Politicians from Philadelphia